The 2009 Thai League Division 1 has 16 teams.

Rules
Teams play each other twice on a home and away basis
3 Points for a win
1 Point for a draw
Teams finishing on same points at the end of the season use head-to-head record to determine finishing position.
The top three teams will be promoted to Premier League.
The top team as champions.
The bottom three teams will be relegated to Division 2.

Prize money
 Champion      : 700,000 Baht
 Runner-up     : 300,000 Baht
 Third Place   : 200,000 Baht
 Fourth Place  : 100,000 Baht
 Fifth Place   :  50,000 Baht
 Sixth Place   :  40,000 Baht
 Seventh Place :  20,000 Baht

Member clubs

Stadia and locations

Bangkok Bank FC (Relegated from Thailand Premier League) 1

 Bangkok Bank FC withdrew from the league before the season began. FAT therefore decided that to fill the league with 16 teams, they would run a pre-season competition featuring the 4 relegated clubs from the Thailand Division 1 League 2008 season.

Pre Season Playoff
The winners of the Pre Season Playoff would fill the void left by Bangkok Bank FC, after they withdrew from the league after being relegated from the Thailand Premier League.

The four semi finalist's in the play-offs, are the four relegated clubs from the 2008 season of the Thailand Division 1 League.

Play-offs

Bracket

Semi finals

Final

Final league table

Results

Top scorers
Last updated October 17, 2009

See also
 2009 Thai Premier League
 2009 Regional League Division 2
 2009 Thai FA Cup
 2009 Kor Royal Cup

References

External links
 Football Association of Thailand

Thai League 2 seasons
2